The Nereid Avenue station (formerly East 238th Street station) is a local station on the IRT White Plains Road Line of the New York City Subway, located at the intersection of Nereid Avenue (East 238th Street) and White Plains Road in the Bronx. It is served by the 2 train at all times and by the 5 train during rush hours in the peak direction. Nereid Avenue is the northern terminal for all peak-direction rush-hour 5 trains that use this branch. However, all 2 trains terminate at the next stop, Wakefield–241st Street.

History
This station was built under the Dual Contracts. On March 3, 1917, IRT White Plains Road Line was extended from East 177th Street–East Tremont Avenue to East 219th Street–White Plains Road, providing the Bronx communities of Williamsbridge and Wakefield with access to rapid transit service. Service was initially operated as a four-car shuttle from 177th Street due to the power conditions at the time. On July 18, 1917, at the request of local residents near the station, the New York Public Service Commission changed the name of the station from Nereid Avenue to East 238th Street.

On December 13, 1920, the final portion of the line opened, extending the line from its previous terminal at 238th Street to the line's permanent terminus at 241st Street. This portion of the line had its opening delayed, owing to construction on the line between the two stations for the construction of the 239th Street Yard to the north of 238th Street. Additional time was required to modify the structure to avoid a grade crossing at the entrance to the yard. The city government took over the IRT's operations on June 12, 1940.

The station was renovated in 2007 at a cost of $14.46 million.

Station layout

This station has three tracks and two side platforms. At the north end of the station, the northbound track ascends to pass over yard leads, while the others descend. A three-story tower is located north of the station which has an old blue and white letter sign "Warning — Do not lean over edge of Platform." North of this tower, two tracks enter the line from the 239th Street Yard.

The 2006 artwork here is called Leaf of Life by Noel Copeland.

Exits
This station has one elevated station house beneath the center of the platforms and tracks. Two staircases from each platform go down to a waiting area. Outside fare control, two staircases go down to the northwest and southeast corners of Nereid Avenue and White Plains Road.

References

External links 

 
 nycsubway.org — Leaf of Life Artwork by Noel Copeland (2006)
 Station Reporter — 2 Train
 The Subway Nut — Nereid Avenue – 238th Street Pictures
 MTA's Arts For Transit — Nereid Avenue – 238th Street (IRT White Plains Road Line)
 Nereid Avenue entrance from Google Maps Street View
Platforms from Google Maps Street View

IRT White Plains Road Line stations
New York City Subway stations in the Bronx
Railway stations in the United States opened in 1917
1917 establishments in New York City
Wakefield, Bronx